The qualification process of women's teams for the 2013 Rugby World Cup Sevens. Automatic qualification was extended to the host and the four semifinalists of the previous cup's tournament. The remaining spots were contested in each of the six regions' respective tournaments.

Qualified teams

Africa
Seven teams competed in Rabat on 29-30 September for an open spot in the World Cup, since South Africa was already automatically qualified from their semifinal placement in the 2009 World Cup Sevens. Tunisia edged out Kenya at the final to reach eligibility.

Pool stage
Pool A
{| class="wikitable" style="text-align: center;"
|-
!width="200"|Team
!width="40"|Pld
!width="40"|W
!width="40"|D
!width="40"|L
!width="40"|PF
!width="40"|PA
!width="40"|+/–
!width="40"|Pts
|-bgcolor=ccffcc
|align=left|
|3||3||0||0||77||5||+72||9
|-bgcolor=ccffcc
|align=left|
|3||2||0||1||73||7||+66||7
|-bgcolor=ccccff
|align=left|
|3||1||0||2||5||72||–67||5
|-bgcolor=ccccff
|align=left|
|3||0||0||3||0||71||–71||3
|}

Pool B
{| class="wikitable" style="text-align: center;"
|-
!width="200"|Team
!width="40"|Pld
!width="40"|W
!width="40"|D
!width="40"|L
!width="40"|PF
!width="40"|PA
!width="40"|+/-
!width="40"|Pts
|-bgcolor=ccffcc
|align=left|
|2||2||0||0||34||5||+29||6
|-bgcolor=ccffcc
|align=left|
|2||1||0||1||7||27||-20||4
|-bgcolor=ccccff
|align=left|
|2||0||0||2||10||19||-9||2
|}

Knockout round
Plate
{{Round4|RD2=Plate Final

|30 September 2012
||0||5
|30 September 2012
||Bye||

|30 September 2012
||14||10
}}CupNorth America/Caribbean
On 25–26 August 2012, there was a tournament held in Twin Elm Rugby Park in Ottawa amongst five teams for one qualification bid, with the United States already qualified by making the semifinals of the 2009 Rugby World Cup women's tournament. It consisted of a round-robin tournament, with a playoff among the four highest-finishing teams, from which hosts Canada emerged winners.

Pool stage
{| class="wikitable" style="text-align: center;"
|-
!width="200"|Team
!width="40"|Pld
!width="40"|W
!width="40"|D
!width="40"|L
!width="40"|PF
!width="40"|PA
!width="40"|+/–
!width="40"|Pts
|-bgcolor=ccccff
|align=left|
|4||4||0||0||196||0||+196||12|-bgcolor=ccccff
|align=left|
|4||3||0||1||60||52||+8||10|-bgcolor=ccccff
|align=left|
|4||2||0||2||68||70||–2||8|-bgcolor=ccccff
|align=left|
|4||1||0||3||46||111||–65||6|-
|align=left|
|4||0||0||4||0||137||–137||4|}

Knockout round

South America

The last qualifying tournament was held on 23−24 February 2013 in Rio de Janeiro for the sole remaining World Cup slot. Eight teams participated, with Brazil winning the tournament to qualify for the second time.

Pool PlayPool A{| class="wikitable" style="text-align: center;"
|-
!width="160"|Teams
!width="40"|Pld
!width="40"|W
!width="40"|D
!width="40"|L
!width="40"|PF
!width="40"|PA
!width="40"|+/−
!width="40"|Pts
|-bgcolor=ccccff
|align=left|
|3||3||0||0||103||12||+91||
|-bgcolor=ccccff
|align=left|
|3||2||0||1||83||36||+47||
|-
|align=left|
|3||1||0||2||50||53||–3||
|-
|align=left|
|3||0||0||3||10||145||–135||
|}Pool B{| class="wikitable" style="text-align: center;"
|-
!width="160"|Teams
!width="40"|Pld
!width="40"|W
!width="40"|D
!width="40"|L
!width="40"|PF
!width="40"|PA
!width="40"|+/−
!width="40"|Pts
|-bgcolor=ccccff
|align=left|
|3||3||0||0||64||5||+59||9|-bgcolor=ccccff
|align=left|
|3||1||1||1||44||29||+15||6|-
|align=left|
|3||1||1||1||32||25||+7||6|-
|align=left|
|3||0||0||3||0||81||–81||3|}

PlayoffsPlateCupAsia
On 6–7 October 2012, ten Asian teams and Oceania third place team Fiji met in Pune, India for a qualification tournament with three bids at stake. Fiji qualified to the World Cup as champions, with China and Japan also rounding out the remainder of the bids.

Pool stagePool A{| class="wikitable" style="text-align: center;"
|-
!width="200"|Team
!width="40"|Pld
!width="40"|W
!width="40"|D
!width="40"|L
!width="40"|PF
!width="40"|PA
!width="40"|+/–
!width="40"|Pts
|-
|align=left|
|2||2||0||0||68||5||+63||6|-
|align=left|
|2||1||0||1||41||19||+22||4|-
|align=left|
|2||0||0||2||0||85||–85||2|}Pool B{| class="wikitable" style="text-align: center;"
|-
!width="200"|Team
!width="40"|Pld
!width="40"|W
!width="40"|D
!width="40"|L
!width="40"|PF
!width="40"|PA
!width="40"|+/–
!width="40"|Pts
|-
|align=left|
|3||3||0||0||130||14||+116||9|-
|align=left|
|3||2||0||1||78||43||+35||7|-
|align=left|
|3||1||0||2||57||70||–13||5|-
|align=left|
|3||0||0||3||0||138||–138||3|}Pool C{| class="wikitable" style="text-align: center;"
|-
!width="200"|Team
!width="40"|Pld
!width="40"|W
!width="40"|D
!width="40"|L
!width="40"|PF
!width="40"|PA
!width="40"|+/–
!width="40"|Pts
|-
|align=left|
|3||3||0||0||119||0||+119||9|-
|align=left|
|3||2||0||1||76||48||+28||7|-
|align=left|
|3||1||0||2||47||67||–20||5|-
|align=left|
|3||0||0||3||7||134||–127||3|}Pool D{| class="wikitable" style="text-align: center;"
|-
!width="200"|Team
!width="40"|Pld
!width="40"|W
!width="40"|D
!width="40"|L
!width="40"|PF
!width="40"|PA
!width="40"|+/–
!width="40"|Pts
|-
|align=left|
|3||3||0||0||108||0||+108||9|-
|align=left|
|3||2||0||1||39||46||–7||7|-
|align=left|
|3||1||0||2||10||61||–51||5|-
|align=left|
|3||0||0||3||20||70||–50||3|}

Knockout roundShieldPlateCupEurope

From 30 June – 1 July, the second leg of the Women's Sevens Grand Prix was held in Moscow among the twelve Grand Prix national teams in addition to the top four teams from prior lower-division tournaments. With Russia being host and therefore automatically eligible for the World Cup, five open bids were contested.

Oceania
8 women's teams met in Lautoka, Fiji for a 3–4 August tournament. With Australia and New Zealand already qualified for the World Cup, the other highest placing country gets to compete in 2012's Asian championship to contest the bid against a prospective Asia 3. With Fiji beating Papua New Guinea for the third place spot, they were invited to the Asian qualification tournament in Pune, India.

Pool stagePool A{| class="wikitable" style="text-align: center;"
|-
!width="200"|Team
!width="40"|Pld
!width="40"|W
!width="40"|D
!width="40"|L
!width="40"|PF
!width="40"|PA
!width="40"|+/–
!width="40"|Pts
|-
|align=left|
|3||3||0||0||113||7||+106||9|-
|align=left|
|3||2||0||1||62||39||+23||7|-
|align=left|
|3||1||0||2||46||51||–5||5|-
|align=left|
|3||0||0||3||24||87||–63||3|}Pool B{| class="wikitable" style="text-align: center;"
|-
!width="200"|Team
!width="40"|Pld
!width="40"|W
!width="40"|D
!width="40"|L
!width="40"|PF
!width="40"|PA
!width="40"|+/–
!width="40"|Pts
|-
|align=left|
|3||3||0||0||100||7||+93||9|-
|align=left|
|3||2||0||1||88||26||+62||7|-
|align=left|
|3||1||0||2||15||99||–84||5|-
|align=left|
|3||0||0||3||7||78||–71||3|}

Knockout roundPlateCup'''

References

2013
Qualifying
2012 in women's rugby union
2012 rugby sevens competitions